Boris Ertel (born 18 November 1983) is a Slovak professional ice hockey player who played with HC Slovan Bratislava in the Slovak Extraliga.

References

External links

Living people
HC Slovan Bratislava players
1983 births
Slovak ice hockey left wingers
Slovak expatriate ice hockey players in the Czech Republic
Expatriate ice hockey players in Denmark
Slovak expatriate sportspeople in Denmark